Rouyn-Noranda Regional County Municipality was a former regional county municipality and census division in the Abitibi-Témiscamingue region of Quebec, Canada.

It was formed in 1981 and dissolved when all of its component municipalities amalgamated into the new City of Rouyn-Noranda on January 1, 2002, as part of the early 2000s municipal reorganization in Quebec.

Based on the last census prior to its dissolution, Rouyn-Noranda RCM consisted of:

The unorganized territory of Rapides-des-Cèdres was occasionally written as Rapide-des-Cèdres (there is an unrelated Rapide-des-Cèdres which is a hamlet within the municipality of Lebel-sur-Quévillon).

See also 
 Municipal history of Quebec

References 

Former regional county municipalities in Quebec
Populated places disestablished in 2002
Rouyn-Noranda